Aiden McCabe (born 27 September 1987) is an Irish hurler who plays as a goalkeeper for the Kerry senior team.

Born in Kilmoyley, County Kerry, McCabe was introduced to hurling in his youth. He developed his skills at Causeway Comprehensive while simultaneously enjoying championship successes at underage levels with the Kilmoyley club. He has won one championship medal with the Kilmoyley senior team.

McCabe made his senior debut during the 2016 Munster League. He has subsequently become a regular member of the starting fifteen.

Career statistics

References

External links
 http://traleetoday.ie/kerry-team-face-cork-announced-mccabe-captain-county-year/

1987 births
Living people
Hurling goalkeepers
Irish plumbers
Kerry inter-county hurlers
Kilmoyley hurlers